Kacha is an airbase of the Russian Black Sea Fleet located in Kacha, Sevastopol, Crimea, Ukraine.

The base is used by the 318th Independent Composite Aviation Regiment flying the Antonov An-26KPA, Beriev Be-12 and the Tupolev Tu-134A and the 25th Independent Shipborne Anti-submarine Helicopter Regiment which flies the Mil Mi-8, Kamov Ka-27 and the Kamov Ka-29.

The base was used by the:
 53rd Fighter Aviation Regiment between 1945 and 1946.
 306th Fighter Aviation Regiment between 1945 and 1947.
 859th Training Center for Naval Aviation between 1981 and 2009.

References

Airports in Crimea
Military facilities in Crimea
Installations of the Russian Navy
Ukrainian airbases